‏The right-to-left mark (RLM) is a non-printing character used in the computerized typesetting of bi-directional text containing a mix of left-to-right scripts (such as Latin and Cyrillic) and right-to-left scripts (such as Arabic, Syriac, and Hebrew).

RLM is used to change the way adjacent characters are grouped with respect to text direction. However, for Arabic script, Arabic letter mark may be a better choice.

Unicode 
In UTF-8 it is E2 80 8F. Usage is prescribed in the Unicode Bidi (bidirectional) Algorithm.

Example of use in HTML
Suppose the writer wishes to inject a run of Arabic or Hebrew (i.e. right-to-left) text into an English paragraph, with an exclamation point at the end of the run on the left hand side.  "I enjoyed staying -- really! -- at his house." With the "really!" in Hebrew‏, the sentence renders as follows:
 I enjoyed staying -- באמת! -- at his house.
(Note that in a computer's memory, the order of the Hebrew characters is ‭ב,א,מ,ת‬.)

With an RLM added after the exclamation mark, it renders as follows:
 I enjoyed staying -- באמת!‏ -- at his house.
(Standards-compliant browsers will render the exclamation mark on the right in the first example, and on the left in the second.)

This happens because the browser recognizes that the paragraph is in a LTR script (Latin), and applies punctuation, which is neutral as to its direction, in coordination with the surrounding (left-to-right) text. The RLM causes the punctuation to be surrounded by only RTL text—the Hebrew and the RLM—and hence be positioned as if it were in right-to-left text, i.e., to the left of the preceding text.

See also 
Arabic letter mark
Left-to-right mark
Bidirectional text

References

External links 
Unicode standard annex #9: The bidirectional algorithm
Unicode character (U+200F)
Unicode

Control characters
Digital typography
Unicode formatting code points